Johan Christian Falkenberg (8 October 1901 – 12 July 1963) was a Norwegian épée and foil fencer. He competed at three Olympic Games.

During the Second World War, Falkenberg was a member of the Norwegian resistance movement, leading Milorg districts 22, 23, 40 and 41 from 1943 onwards. For his service, Falkenberg was awarded the Defence Medal 1940–1945, as well as French and British decorations.

References

External links
 

1901 births
1963 deaths
Norwegian male épée fencers
Olympic fencers of Norway
Fencers at the 1924 Summer Olympics
Fencers at the 1928 Summer Olympics
Fencers at the 1936 Summer Olympics
Sportspeople from Oslo
Norwegian resistance members
Norwegian male foil fencers